St. Luke's Church is a Roman Catholic parish located in Defence Colony B-68, New Delhi, India. It is under the administration of the Archdiocese of Delhi. The building was constructed in 1979.

The Defence Colony was a district set aside for housing armed forces personnel. The original church was built on a vacant residential plot.

The present Parish Priest is Fr. James Peter Raj. Mass is celebrated in English, Hindi, and Malayalam language. Details of Mass timings and other details regarding the Church can be obtained from Homepage.

There are various religious houses and institutions of this parish:

Religious houses and institutions in the parish

See also
 Roman Catholicism in India

External links
St. Luke's Church in Defense Colony Homepage
Archdiocese of Delhi

Roman Catholic churches in Delhi
Churches in New Delhi
Roman Catholic churches completed in 1979
20th-century Roman Catholic church buildings in India